Liga ASOBAL 1996–97 season was the seventh since its establishment. The league was played in a round-robin format through 30 rounds. The team with most points earned was the champion. On the contrary, teams from 14th to 16th were relegated and teams in 12th and 13th position had to play the in–out playoff.

Overall standing

In–Out playoff

Pescanova Chapela remained in Liga ASOBAL.

Barakaldo UPV relegated to División de Honor B. Altea promoted to Liga ASOBAL.

Top goal scorers

1995-96
handball
handball
Spain